Łukasz Koszarek (born 12 January 1984) is a Polish professional basketball player for Legia Warszawa of the Polish Basketball League. He is a  point guard.

Professional career
Koszarek has spent most of his career in the Polish Basketball League. He made his debut for Polonia Warbud Warszawa in 2003–04, seeing limited action off the bench for the team. However, the following year, he saw significantly more action, averaging 11.6 points and 4.8 assists per game in leading the team to a third-place finish in the league.

In 2008–09 season, he averaged 13.9 points and 6.1 assists per game for fourth-place Anwil Włocławek. After a successful season in Anwil, he moved to Italy and signed a two-year contract with JuveCaserta, where he was just a backup point guard and didn’t see much playing time. In his last season abroad he averaged 4.9 points, 1.6 rebounds and 1.5 assists.

He came back to Poland in the summer of 2011, when he signed a contract with Trefl Sopot. In the 2011–12 season Koszarek was voted the MVP of the league and led Trefl to finals, where they lost to Asseco Prokom. Koszarek finished the season averaging 15.5 points, 3.7 rebounds and 5.4 assists per game.

The 2012–13 season Koszarek started in Asseco Prokom, but after the club struggled with financial problems, he moved to Zielona Góra in the middle of the season and won his first Polish championship title playing for Stelmet. After that season he signed a multi-year contract with the club. Koszarek re-signed with the team on 20 July 2020.

On 31 May 2021 he signed with Legia Warszawa of the Polish Basketball League.

International career
Koszarek is also a member of the Polish national basketball team. He was selected to the national team for the first time at EuroBasket 2007.  He was also selected to play for the host Polish team at the EuroBasket 2009, where he ranked fifth on the team in points, fourth in rebounds, and second in assists.

He also played at EuroBasket 2011, EuroBasket 2013, EuroBasket 2015, and EuroBasket 2017.

He was also a member of the Polish national team at Basketball World Cup 2019 in China, where he averaged 2.5 points, 0.8 rebounds and 2.5 assists in 14 minutes per game.

Honours

Club
Anwil Wloclawek
Polish Supercup Winner: 2007

Trefl Sopot
Polish Cup Winner: 2012

Zielona Góra
Polish PLK Champion: 2012–13, 2014–15, 2015–16, 2016–17, 2019–20
Polish Cup Winner: 2015, 2017 
Polish Supercup Winner: 2015

Individual
3× PLK Best Polish Player: 2011–12, 2012–13, 2013–14
2× Polish Cup MVP: 2012, 2017

Career statistics

EuroLeague

|-
| style="text-align:left;"| 2012–13
| style="text-align:left;"| Asseco Prokom
| 10 || 9 || 29.9 || .420 || .366 || .903 || 2.9 || 4.0 || 1.1 || .1 || 11.1 || 11.6
|-
| style="text-align:left;"| 2013–14
| style="text-align:left;"| Zielona Góra
| 10 || 10 || 31.3 || .378 || .314 || .857 || 3.8 || 5.8 || .4 || .1 || 8.5 || 8.9
|- class="sortbottom"
| style="text-align:left;"| Career
| style="text-align:left;"|
| 20 || 19 || 30.6 || .398 || .342 || .895 || 3.4 || 4.9 || .8 || .1 || 9.8 || 10.2

References

External links
Łukasz Koszarek at Euroleague.net

1984 births
Living people
2019 FIBA Basketball World Cup players
Asseco Gdynia players
Basket Zielona Góra players
Juvecaserta Basket players
KK Włocławek players
Lega Basket Serie A players
Legia Warsaw (basketball) players
People from Września
Point guards
Polish expatriate basketball people in Italy
Polish men's basketball players
Polonia Warszawa (basketball) players
Sportspeople from Greater Poland Voivodeship
Trefl Sopot players
Turów Zgorzelec players